Wrightia natalensis grows as a small to medium-sized deciduous tree. Its fragrant flowers feature a creamy yellow corolla. Habitat is dry woodland and scrub forest from sea-level to  altitude. W. natalensis is native to Zimbabwe, Mozambique, Eswatini and South Africa.

References

natalensis
Plants described in 1907
Flora of Zimbabwe
Flora of Mozambique
Flora of Swaziland
Flora of South Africa